Har or HAR may refer to:

People 
 Har Bilas Sarda (1867-1955), Indian academic, judge and politician
 Har Sharma (1922–1992), Indian cricket umpire

Mythology 
 Hár and Hárr, among the many names of Odin in Norse mythology
 Horus, an Egyptian god
 Shiva, a Hindu god

Other uses 
 Har (Blake), a character in the mythological writings of William Blake
 Hár (crater), a crater on Jupiter's moon Callisto
 Har (Korean surname)
 HAR (file format), the HTTP Archive format
 Harari language, spoken in Ethiopia, ISO 639-3 code
 Harrisburg Transportation Center, Amtrak station code
 Highway advisory radio
 Human accelerated regions, the name of some human genes
 MC-Hár, a Faroese rap rock group
Har, a component of Hebrew placenames literally meaning "mountain"